Judith Sulian (May 13, 1920 – October 18, 1991) was an Argentine film actress. She was awarded the Silver Condor Award for Best Supporting Actress for her performance in  The Abyss Opens (1945),

Selected filmography
 Girls Orchestra (1941)
 The Abyss Opens (1945)
 Savage Pampas (1945)
 The Lady of Death (1946)

References

Bibliography 
 Abel Posadas, Mónica Landro, Marta Speroni. Cine sonoro argentino: 1933-1943''. El Calafate Editores, 2005.

External links 
 

1920 births
1991 deaths
Argentine film actresses
20th-century Argentine actresses
Argentine expatriates in Spain